Darcy Wakaluk (born March 14, 1966) is a Canadian former professional ice hockey goaltender who played in the National Hockey League from 1988 to 1997.

Wakaluk played for the WHL's Kelowna Wings and Spokane Chiefs. After being drafted by the Buffalo Sabres, Wakaluk then spent part of 5 seasons with the Rochester Americans of the AHL, winning the Calder Cup Championship in his first year (1986–87) and reaching the Finals once again in 1989-90.

On December 6, 1987, Wakaluk became the first American Hockey League goaltender to score a goal when he shot the puck the length of the ice into an empty net in a game with Rochester against Utica. Two days later, Ron Hextall of the Philadelphia Flyers would accomplish the same feat becoming the first NHL goalie to score a goal, also shooting into an empty net. Darcy would go on to be inducted into the Rochester Americans Hall of Fame in 2012.

He was selected 144th overall by the Buffalo Sabres in the 7th round of the 1984 NHL Entry Draft and started playing for them in the 1988–89 season, where he appeared in six games. He played another 16 games (and 2 playoff contests) with Buffalo in 1990-91 until being traded to the Minnesota North Stars for Buffalo's 1991 8th round pick and future considerations on May 26, 1991.

He played for the North Stars for two seasons, and subsequently the Dallas Stars, where, after taking over starting duties for Andy Moog at the beginning the 1994 playoffs, he swept the St. Louis Blues in Round One, winning the last game at St. Louis Arena. In 1996, he was signed as a free agent by the Phoenix Coyotes, where he played his final season after a career-ending knee injury in a game vs Washington in January 1997 forced his retirement.

Since retiring Darcy has been a Goaltending Coach for 4 teams in the WHL and another in the AJHL. He spent 9 seasons as Goaltending Coach with the Calgary Hitmen, (where he won a WHL Championship in 2010 while coaching a young future NHL star netminder Martin Jones), previously with the Vancouver Giants, Crowsnest Pass Timberwolves, Kamloops Blazers, and most recently with the Lethbridge Hurricanes.

Career statistics

Regular season and playoffs

References

External links

1966 births
Living people
Buffalo Sabres draft picks
Buffalo Sabres players
Canadian people of Ukrainian descent
Dallas Stars players
Flint Spirits players
Ice hockey people from Alberta
Kalamazoo Wings (1974–2000) players
Kelowna Wings players
Minnesota North Stars players
People from the Municipal District of Pincher Creek No. 9
Phoenix Coyotes players
Rochester Americans players
Spokane Chiefs players
Canadian ice hockey goaltenders
Canadian expatriate ice hockey players in the United States